Nanban is a 2012 Indian Tamil-language coming-of-age comedy-drama film directed by Shankar. It is a remake of Rajkumar Hirani & Vidhu Vinod Chopra's Hindi film 3 Idiots (2009). The film stars Vijay, Jiiva, Srikanth, Ileana D'Cruz, Sathyaraj and Sathyan. The film's soundtrack and background score were composed by Harris Jayaraj and cinematography was handled by Manoj Paramahamsa. The film was produced by Gemini Film Circuit.

The film recounts the quest of two friends to find a lost buddy, whom they remember as a brilliant and optimistic student.  Flashbacks portray episodes of their college life, up until their friend quietly vanished after graduation.  The quest is triggered by the appearance of a rival classmate who once made a long-forgotten bet with them, and leads to a funeral that goes impossibly out of control, and a wedding they must crash.

A lengthy and controversial delay in casting delayed filming by a year. Filming took place for a total of eight months in various locations in Europe and India. The film was released on 12 January 2012 to generally positive reviews. The film was also screened at the Melbourne Film Festival.

Indian Express reported the film grossed 150 crore at the box office.

Plot 

Wildlife photographer Venkat Ramakrishnan receives a phone call from his collegemate Srivatsan, claiming he knows where Venkat's long-lost friend Panchavan "Pari" Pariventhan is. Venkat meets up with another friend, Sevarkodi Senthil, and they rush to the Ideal Engineering College (IEC) to meet Srivatsan. After talking about his bet with Pari about who would become more successful, Srivatsan reveals that Pari is in Ooty and the three begin their journey.

Over a flashback ten years prior, it is shown that Venkat came to study at IEC as his father forced him to pursue engineering. He befriends Senthil, whose family hopes he will bring them out of poverty, and Pari, a carefree student who loves learning. Pari, Senthil and Venkat meet their college director Dr. Virumandi Santhanam (referred to as Virus by the students), whose draconian teaching philosophy contrasts with Pari's easygoing lifestyle. One day, Paneer Selvam, a student with a passion for engineering similar to Pari's, is denied graduation by Virus on grounds of failure to submit his project. Pari tries to finish Pannerselvam's project, but Paneelselvam commits suicide before he can show it to him. Pari attempts to change Virus' view on pressure and suicide in colleges, but is strongly rebuked. Virus sends letters informing Venkat and Senthil's families of the situation. After Venkat's and Senthil's parents confront Pari, the hungry trio gatecrash a wedding for dinner, not knowing that it is the wedding of one of Virus' daughters, Shwetha. They also meet Virus' other daughter, Ria, and her materially obsessive fiancé, Rakesh. The following morning, Virus advises Venkat and Senthil that Pari is a bad influence, using their individual financial situations as evidence. While Venkat remains loyal to Pari, Senthil shifts rooms to live with Srivatsan, a student who believes that rote memorization is the best way to study. He also takes pills that he believes enhance his memory, while also causing excessive silent yet extremely stinky farts. Having to smell this every day, the other students refer to him as the "Kusu Silencer", meaning "Silent Farter". Seeking to teach Senthil a lesson about rote learning, Pari and Venkat edit obscene words into Srivatsan's Teachers' Day speech. For example, "karpikkum" (to teach) became "karpazhikum" (to rape) and "kalvi" (education) became "kalavi" (sex). However, Senthil remains unconvinced. Srivatsan learns about the prank and angrily confronts Pari, challenging him to see who'll be more successful in ten years. After a few days, Pari manipulates Ria into insulting and dumping Rakesh. He learns that Senthil's father has had a stroke, and drives him on a reluctant Ria's scooter to the hospital. Senthil arrives and, after overhearing how that timely intervention saved his father's life, reunites with Venkat and Pari. Ria begins to fall in love with Pari. The next day, they all complete their exams, but Venkat and Senthil are sad to learn they had the two lowest scores. To everyone's surprise, Pari placed first in the entire university, beating a saddened and irritated Srivatsan. When Pari says that his friends will get a job despite their low scores, Virus promises that if this occurs, he will shave his mustache off. 

In the present, Venkat, Senthil and Srivatsan reach Ooty and go to the house where Pari lives. Over there, they are shocked to meet another young man, who identifies himself as Panchavan Pariventhan. When Venkat asks Srivatsan how he got the address of this "impostor" Pari, he reveals that he got the address when his secretary came to Ooty to make a business deal with a famous scientist/inventor named Kosaksi Pasapugazh. Venkat and Senthil then confront and threaten the "imposter" who, in confessing that he is the real Pari, inadvertently reveals to them that the acquaintance they knew was actually nicknamed "Pappu," the son of the Pariventhan family's gardener, who had an immense passion for learning. Pari made Pappu do all of his homework and, after Pari's father found out, he let the ruse continue, saying he didn't want his son to experience the same disrespect he experienced due to his illiteracy.  Pari went to London for four years, while Pappu assumed his identity in college, promising to sever ties afterward. However, Pappu warned Pari that his friends would come looking for him after some time. Venkat and Senthil leave with Srivatsan for Dhanushkodi, where Pari apparently works at a school.

During their final years of college, Pari and Ria begin a relationship. One night, Pari sneaks into Virus' house to propose to Ria while Venkat and Senthil drunkenly urinate on Virus' letterbox. Virus threatens to rusticate Senthil unless he acts as a witness against Pari. Not wanting to disappoint his family or betray his friend, he jumps out of a window, attempting suicide. Pari, Senthil, and Ria all help him recuperate successfully over the next two months while Virus rescinds his rustication. Afterwards, Senthil secures a job with an engineering firm and Venkat convinces his father to let him work as a wildlife photographer. Virus barber thus shaves his mustache off. Virus feels insulted and rigs the final exam paper to fail Senthil, but Ria gives Pari the duplicate key to her father's office, encouraging him to copy the rigged paper for Senthil.

In the present, Venkat and Senthil suddenly remember Ria, and turn around to reach her wedding to Rakesh in Coimbatore. Venkat sneaks in to reunite with Ria while Senthil poses as a housekeeper to show Rakesh is still a materialistic brat. Ria however, initially refuses, despite hearing Rakesh yell about the coat Senthil ruined. Senthil proceeds to fill in as the groom and convinces Ria that she still loves Pari. Ria elopes with the duo and Srivatsan to go to Dhanushkodi and meet Pari. 

Back in their final year of college, Pari and Venkat successfully copy the question paper, but Senthil refuses to use it. Virus discovers them and rusticates them in the middle of the night. Ria reveals that Virus' son, who Virus thought had died from a train accident, had committed suicide because Virus put too much pressure on him to be an engineer. As Pari, Venkat, and Senthil leave the campus in the middle of a thunderstorm, they come across Ria's now-pregnant sister Shwetha as she goes into labour. Seeing as Shwetha cannot reach a hospital because of the rain, the trio apply their knowledge of engineering to build a makeshift venthouse with the other students. Shwetha gives birth to a healthy boy, much to the delight of the other students. Realizing the fault in his ways and how smart Pari is, Virus lets the trio stay for the final exams and gifts Pari a very rare Space Pen.

In the present, Venkat, Senthil, Ria, and Srivatsan reach the school in Dhanushkodi and reunite with Pari. Ria and Pari finally kiss while Venkat and Senthil reunite with him. Srivatsan condescendingly insults Pari's apparent status as a schoolteacher and declares that he has won the bet. When Ria asks Pari for his real name, he reveals that he is Kosaksi Pasapugazh, the inventor Srivatsan's company was trying to sign the deal with. Pasapugazh calls off the deal and reveals himself to Srivatsan, who is shocked. Pasapugazh, Ria, Venkat and Senthil run away laughing while a humiliated Srivatsan chases after them.

Cast 

 Vijay as Pappu / Kosaksi Pasapugazh" / Panchavan Pariventhan : He is called Pari. He is a very intelligent student who knocked Silencer in exams, being the topper of the batch. He was having a helping mentality always. He was in love with Riya. Later he left everyone after graduation. Then he is found, after a long searching by his friends, as a scientist and Businessman who runs a school and is partially a teacher too.
 Jiiva as Sevarkodi Senthil: He is from a poor family with mother as a retired teacher and paralysed father. He was studying engineering to earn a good job and to get his sister married. Later he became a rich Businessman after earning a job.
 Srikanth as Venkat Ramakrishnan: He is an amateur wildlife photographer. He loved photography but his father wanted him to become an engineer. Later he becomes a good wildlife photographer and had written several books regarding photography. He was in love with Nimi.
 Ileana as Riya: She is a clever and smart doctor. She is the 2nd daughter of Virus. She was in love with Pari.(Voice dubbed by Andrea Jeremiah)
 Sathyaraj as Virumandi Santhanam ('Virus'): Principal of the engineering college. He is very strict and disciplined. He hates Pari because he used to question Virus against his rules or discipline.
 Sathyan as Srivatsan alias silencer/silent kusu: A topper student who was very well in all subjects. He was a little back in speaking Tamil. He too hated Pari.
 Anuya as Shwetha Santhanam : Riya's elder sister, and Virus's first daughter.
 T. M. Karthik as Rakesh ('Pricetag'): Riya's ex-fiancé, who cares only about money and ostentation.
 Manobala as Librarian Bose
 Uma as Mrs. Ramakrishnan, Venkat's mother, a loving and caring parent.
 Aadukalam Naren as Ramakrishnan (nicknamed Hitler Ramakrishnan by Pari, Venkat and Senthil), Venkat's father, a strict but loving parent who just wants his son to be happy
 Sreeja Ravi as Doctor
 Sreedevi Gengiah as Senthil's sister
 Indrans as Govindan, Virus's assistant 
 Balaji Venugopal as "Semester" Purai, a senior college student at IEC responsible for leading the ragging there.
 Venkat Sundar as Ragging Senior
 Rinson Simon as younger Manimaran, nicknamed "Millimetre": an adolescent, he earns a small living by doing errands for students, such as laundry, finishing assignments, and getting groceries. Pari persuades him to buy a school uniform and sneak into school to gain an education.
 Vikas as older Manimaran, nicknamed "Centimetre": assistant to Pari/Kosaksi Pasapugazh in Dhanushkodi
 Shankar Sundaram as Examiner
 Ramanathan as Interviewer

Cameo appearances
 S. J. Suryah as the real Panchavan Parivendhan. It is from him that Senthil and Venkat learn the truth: Panchavan's father sponsored an orphaned servant boy called 'Pappu', who had demonstrated his intelligence and love of learning, to earn a degree in the real Panchavan's name, while he was in London. He appreciates what Pappu did for him, and tells Senthil and Venkat where to find him. His sister Nimi was in love with Venkat.
 Vijay Vasanth as Paneer Selvam: a student with a passion for machines. After Virus tells him that he will not graduate, he commits suicide.
 Shanmugasundaram as Kalvi (Education) Minister, who appears in the speech scene, where he gets insulted by Silencer, along with Virus 
 Ajay Rathnam as Panchavan and Nimi's father
 S. Shankar as Director in Asku Laska song
 Atlee as Assistant Director in Asku Laska song
 Shobi in Asku Laska song

Production

Pre-production 
Following Gemini Film Circuit's purchase of the remake rights for 3 Idiots in January 2010, there was much speculation in regards to the three title roles played by Aamir Khan, R. Madhavan and Sharman Joshi in the original. Gemini Film Circuit approached noted directors Shankar, Vishnuvardhan and S. Dharani to replace Rajkumar Hirani as the director, with the approval from Shankar leading to him being signed. Despite speculation that he was set to pull out from directing his first remake as it would be a step down from his previous film, Enthiran, Shankar stated his commitment in October 2010. He later added that, "he came across 3 Idiots during the making of Endhiran, and it was that moment he decided to break his self-imposed rule – making only original movies – and decided to direct his first remake venture."

Development 

Harris Jayaraj and Yuvan Shankar Raja were approached to compose the soundtrack, with Shankar settling for the former with whom he had worked in the 2005 action film Anniyan earlier. Meanwhile, Manoj Paramahamsa, whose work in Vinnaithaandi Varuvaayaa and Eeram had been critically acclaimed, was signed on as the cinematographer. Sound designer Resul Pookutty and visual effects designer V. Srinivas Mohan joined the crew, following a successful collaboration in Enthiran.

Casting 

For the lead role, played in 3 Idiots by Aamir Khan, initial reports suggested that Suriya, Mahesh Babu and Ram Charan were the front runner, who however The actor cited not knowing that Shankar would direct the film he denied the film, later revealed by him in Movie Telugu Version Promotions, which he attended as chief guest.  A special screening for the film industry included Vijay, who expressed his desire to work in the film, and was subsequently signed up by Gemini Film Circuits to portray the lead role. However, by mid-December 2010, soon after trial shoots were held, Vijay walked out the film following disputes over his dates, with Suriya being labelled as his likely replacement. Reports claimed that talks with Suriya failed, since the actor had demanded salary increase and dubbing rights for the Telugu-version of the film. Suriya's reasons for refusing the offer was later confirmed not to be true, with Suriya himself revealing that he had opted out only because of other film commitments and "did not want to keep Shankar waiting". As a result, Vijay was once again finalised for the role.

The roles of the other two title characters took considerably longer to confirm. R. Madhavan was initially approached to reprise his role from the original but made it clear that he was unwilling to be a part of the remake, citing the film had already "gone down in history". Early indications suggested that Udhayanidhi Stalin had replaced him but the claims were false. In November 2010, reports emerged that Vinay Rai or Nakul were set to play the role, however Vinay cited that he refused the project as the role was not as meaty as the other two characters. Consequently, the production house signed Srikanth to play the role, after seeing his performance in Drohi, which had come after several box-office failures for him. Sharman Joshi's role was originally offered to Silambarasan, but after discussions, it was revealed that Silambarasan could not do as he felt he didn't suit the character. Subsequently, the role was offered to Siddharth, a protege of Shankar, who also went on to refuse the project. Despite further reports that Arya and Jiiva were being considered, the latter signed on and agreed with Shankar that he would play Joshi's role instead of Madhavan's. The role played by Kareena Kapoor in the original was offered to Asin Thottumkal. However Ileana D'Cruz was signed on for the film after attempts to cast Katrina Kaif in the film had failed. The college professor's role was given to Sathyaraj, despite early indications that Prakash Raj would be approached. Omi Vaidya was unable to reprise his role from the original and comedian Sathyan Sivakumar was signed on to essay his role after attempts to sign Sricharan of Payanam fame has failed, while S. J. Surya signed on to appear in a guest role, portraying the role enacted by Javed Jaffrey. Anuya Bhagvath was signed up for a supporting role. Stage artist Sreedevi Gengiah was selected to play Jiiva's sister. Raju Jeyamohan was initially chosen to play the older version of Rinson Simon's character Millimeter, but was later removed as his eyes did not match Rinson Simon's; the role went to Vikas.

Filming 

The first schedule of filming was held in Ooty, where scenes involving Ileana, Srikanth and Jiiva were shot. During the second schedule scenes involving the lead cast were canned at Forest Research Institute, Dehradun and Pondicherry Engineering College, Pondicherry and a car chase at various places in Chennai, while two songs were filmed in London and Buckingham during the third schedule. Some significant parts of the film were shot in Chennai at Sun Studios, Kothandapani Studios and the Ampa Skywalk Mall, as well as Koyambedu water tank for three days, for which an Akila crane was used. Further filming, including the climax, was held at various locations in Europe, Andamans and Coimbatore. Filming was wrapped-up in October with a song featuring Vijay and Ileana, which was choreographed by Farah Khan. The filming process lasted for eight months.

Shankar wanted to paint a train for the song sequence, so the team decided to stick paper and then paste the painting on it. Art director Muthuraj hired some 250 artists from various states who were well versed in folk drawings and finished the entire job at breakneck speed and returned the train in time.

Themes and influences 
The film is a remake of Rajkumar Hirani's 3 Idiots (2009), which itself was adapted from the novel Five Point Someone – What not to do at IIT! by Chetan Bhagat. The film deals with the theme that one shouldn't run behind success and rather pursue his/her own interests. If one develops the right skill anything is possible. According to Gauthaman Bhaskaran of Hindustan Times, "Nanban's message is profound [..] given India's exploitative and unimaginative education system. The film lambasts bookishness, the mad chase for marks, [..] the joy of discovering. Parental and peer pressure and the frightfully huge fees for professional courses push boys and girls into performing puppets. The higher your grades, the closer you are to securing a centum, the brighter become your chances of making it in life".

The film shows characters having various interests. The character Pari is against the educational system and insists his classmates not to run behind grades rather derive pleasure by understanding and assimilating things while his principal Virumandi Sandhanam aka Virus (Sathyaraj) wants students to become a book worm to excel in academics. Venkat is interested in wildlife photography but his parents compel him to study engineering. Senthil hails from a poor family and is compelled to study a professional course only to bail out his family from all troubles.

The film also uses real inventions by little-known people in India's backyards. The brains behind the innovations were Remya Jose, a student from Kerala, who created the exercise-bicycle/washing-machine; Mohammad Idris, a barber from Meerut district in Uttar Pradesh, who invented a bicycle-powered horse clipper; and Jahangir Painter, a painter from Maharashtra, who made the scooter-powered flour mill which was featured in the original Hindi film.

Music 

The soundtrack and background score was composed by Harris Jayaraj, collaborating with Shankar for the second time after Anniyan (2005). This film also marks Vijay's first collaboration with Harris Jayaraj. The album features six tracks, with lyrics being provided by Pa. Vijay, Viveka, Na. Muthukumar and Madhan Karky, the latter two penning lyrics for two songs each. Notably, Karky's lyrics in "Asku Laska" include more than 16 different languages. The track "Heartiley Battery" is a Classical Raga based item number, set in Shuddha Dhanyasi raga. The full soundtrack album was released on 23 December 2011. The release of the Telugu dubbed version album Snehitudu was held on 20 January 2012 in Hyderabad.

Reception

IndiaGlitz.com wrote that the music album is "ready to mesmerize you". Behindwoods.com labelled it a "winner all the way", adding that it had "good variety all through the album [...] and ample scope for festivities in the theater". Top10cinema.com wrote that it had three songs that "strike spectacularly with its rich music and commendable lyrics", calling it a "good work by Harris". KollyTalk.com called it "Youthful and refreshing". On the contrary, Pavithra Srinivasan from Rediff wrote that there was "nothing new about the music in Nanban", concluding that Harris Jayaraj had "obviously taken the safe route, sticking to his usual template for most of the songs in this album".

Release

Theatrical 
Prior to the release, Nanban was voted the "most expected film" of 2012 through an online public poll conducted by Vikatan. The film was released on 12 January 2012 for Pongal in 925 screens worldwide.

Nanban advance booking opened well in Chennai city and suburbs. It had the highest number of 77 shows in a single day at Mayajaal multiplex in Chennai at that time. The film opened in nearly 625 screens in Tamil Nadu. It was released in 50 screens in Chennai and 31 screens in Hyderabad. It released simultaneously in UK, the US, Malaysia and Singapore. Nanban became the first Tamil film to be released with French subtitles in France. It also became the first film to get exempted from the 30 percent entertainment tax in Tamil Nadu by the new scheme introduced by the Government of Tamil Nadu.

Distribution 
Telugu film distributor Dil Rajubought the theatrical rights of Snehitudu, the Telugu dubbed version of Nanban for Andhra Pradesh market. Snehitudu was released on 26 January 2012.

Home media 
The film was broadcast on 1 May 2012, four months after its theatrical release on the occasion of May day and registered a TRP of 11.1 points.

Indian DVD were marketed by Moser Baer. Overseas DVD were marketed by Suara DVD.

Reception

Critical response 
Sify called it an "engaging film with noble intentions. It deserves viewing because films like this are hard to find". Behindwoods.com rated the film 3.5/5 and wrote: "Nanban has got more than something for everyone. It is very unlikely that a person finds such a wholesome package unsatisfying. All is absolutely well!" Pavithra Srinivasan from Rediff.com gave the film 3/5 stars, describing it as "the perfect feel-good fare for the festive season, despite minor glitches". Malathi Rangarajan from The Hindu wrote: "Nanban is an enjoyable cocktail of humour with some sentiment and sadness thrown in for that extra appeal. Once again Shankar proves the master craftsman that he is". Anupama Subramanian from Deccan Chronicle gave the film 3/5 stars, while labelling it as a "feel-good film with a larger message and a brilliant feat by Vijay which makes the film a not-to-be-missed one!" Venkateswaran Narayanan from Times of India noted several anachronisms in the film (such as YouTube being used in 2002 when it was actually launched in 2005) but wrote: "Such minor cribbing apart, all is well with Nanban because Shankar's retelling of 3 Idiots retains its soul and has its heart in the right place". Zee News wrote: "Nanban is a must watch, grab your tickets now. It's the best gift Vijay could have given to his diehard fans this Pongal". IndiaGlitz.com named it a "clear entertainer", "a whiff of fresh air from the mindless masala movies" and a welcome change". Rohit Ramachandran of nowrunning.com rated it 3/5 stating that "Nanban is Rajkumar Hirani's 3 Idiots staged and presented by Shankar in a different language with grandeur. The base material is solid and Shankar obediently traces it. Out comes an uplifting entertainer that will draw raves from viewers of all kinds". Oneindia.in gave a positive verdict and wrote, "All is well. It is a Shankar's Sankrathi feast for the audience! Do not hesitate to watch Nanban even if you have seen 3 Idiots". CNN-IBN said that it was "sweet and satisfying". Ananda Vikatan rated the film 44 out of 100. Acclaimed actor Kamal Haasan appreciated Vijay's performance in the movie and lauded the team's effort in making such a good entertainer. At the Internet Movie Database the film stands up with a rating of 7.7 out of 10 stars. Jeevi from Idlebrain.com with regards to the Telugu dubbed version Snehithudu commented that "the magic of 3 idiots is missing", and gave 3/5 stars. Indiaglitz stated that Snehithudu was a "passable remake".

Box office

India 
The film accounted for 66% of the takings at the Chennai box offIEC on its second weekend and 64% on its third weekend. In Coimbatore and Nilgiris area, Nanban opened in 70 screens and netted  in the first week. It also got a great opening at the Bangalore box-offIEC, where it was still featured in Top 5 even one month after its release.

Overseas 
Nanban was released in 7 screens in Australia and grossed $76,580 in its first weekend. Overall it had grossed $110,422. In UK, it collected $173,789 in its first week with a per screen average of $7,241 in 24 theatres. After its 4-week run the film collected £ (16.6 million) and became the 4th highest grosser in UK. It also secured the first place in the Malaysian box-offIEC in the first week released in 37 screens, and collected a total of $871,959 after a six-week run.
It collected a sum of  after 18 days at the Australian box offIEC, whereas it had collected  at the Malaysian box offIEC within the same period.

Accolades

Notes

References

External links 
 
 
 

2012 films
2010s Tamil-language films
2010s buddy comedy-drama films
2010s coming-of-age comedy-drama films
Films about the education system in India
Films directed by S. Shankar
Films scored by Harris Jayaraj
Films shot in Ooty
Films shot in London
Films shot in Madurai
Films shot in Uttarakhand
Films shot in Himachal Pradesh
Indian buddy comedy-drama films
Indian coming-of-age comedy-drama films
Tamil remakes of Hindi films
Indian nonlinear narrative films
Films set in universities and colleges
Films shot in Spain
Films set in Chennai
2012 comedy films
2012 drama films